Rusty Wright is an American football coach. He is the head football coach at the University of Tennessee at Chattanooga, position he has held since 2019. Wright replaced Tom Arth, who left to be the head football coach at the University of Akron. Before being named the head coach at Chattanooga, Wright was a player and assistant coach at Chattanooga and was an assistant at Miami University, Butler University, Gardner–Webb University, Furman University, Reinhardt University, and Georgia State University.

Head coaching record

References

External links
 Chattanooga profile

Year of birth missing (living people)
Living people
American football tight ends
Butler Bulldogs football coaches
Chattanooga Mocs football coaches
Chattanooga Mocs football players
Furman Paladins football coaches
Gardner–Webb Runnin' Bulldogs football coaches
Georgia State Panthers football coaches
Miami RedHawks football coaches
Reinhardt Eagles football coaches
Sportspeople from Aiken, South Carolina